Ranji H. Nagaswami was Chief Executive Officer of Hirtle, Callaghan & Co. She has nearly 30 years of distinguished investment and executive management experience in the industry in both the private and public sector. In recent years she served as Operating Partner and Senior Advisor at Corsair Capital, a leading global private equity firm focused on investing in the financial services industry and prior to that worked at Bridgewater Associates, the $130 billion global macro hedge fund and risk-parity strategy pioneer.

Education 
Nagaswami earned a Bachelor of Commerce from Bombay University in India, an MBA from the Yale School of Management and is a Chartered Financial Analyst (CFA) Charterholder.

Career 
From 2010 through to 2012, Nagaswami served as Chief Investment Advisor to Mayor Michael Bloomberg, City of New York for the City's $150 billion Employee Retirement Systems. Prior to joining the public sector, Nagaswami was previously Chief Investment Officer within the Blend Strategies team of AllianceBernstein L.P. She served from 2004 - 2008 as Chief Investment Officer and a member of the Executive Board of AllianceBernstein Investments, the group's retail division. From 2001 until 2004, Nagaswami was a senior portfolio manager of the Bernstein U.S. Value Equities team and a member of the U.S. Value Equities Investment Policy Group. Nagaswami joined Sanford C. Bernstein in 1999. From 1986 to 1999, she was at UBS Asset Management and its predecessor organizations where her last role was Managing Director and Co-Head of U.S. Fixed Income.

Boards 
Nagaswami has worked to promote sound investment policy and pension governance reform through public speaking engagements and advisor consultations with institutional investors. Nagaswami is a Visiting Executive Fellow at the Yale School of Management's International Center for Finance and is working to launch the Finance Fellows program within the Aspen Institute's Global Leadership Network.

Nagaswami is a Member of the CFA Institute's Ethics and Standards Advisory Council, the UAW VEBA Medical Benefits Trust Investment Advisory Council, and a Henry Crown Fellow at the Aspen Institute. She was previously a member of the Yale University Investments Committee, the Yale School of Management Advisory Board, Trustee of Greenwich Academy and on the North American Council of Ashoka, a global fellowship of social entrepreneurs.

References 

Yale School of Management alumni
American money managers
American people of Indian descent
American Hindus
University of Mumbai alumni
Living people
CFA charterholders
Henry Crown Fellows
Year of birth missing (living people)
21st-century American women